Balfour Watson Currie,  (November 1, 1902 –  January 8, 1981) was a Canadian scientist specializing in the fields of meteorology and climatology.

Early life 
Born in Montana, he came to Saskatchewan at an early age. His parents moved to a farm homestead at Netherhill, near Kindersley, in the west central region of the province. Because of his pioneer heritage, he was equally comfortable with internationally renowned scientists or with farmers in the field. He came to the University of Saskatchewan as a student and received a Bachelor-level degree in Physics (1925) and a Master-level degree in Physics (1927). His Ph.D. program at McGill University was completed in 1930.

Career 
He was a staff member of the Department of Physics at the University of Saskatchewan (1928 - 1981), was Professor of Physics (1943–70) Head of the Department (1952–61), founder of the Institute of Space and Atmospheric Studies (1956–66), Dean of Graduate Studies (1959–70) and Vice-president, Research (1967–74). Upon his retirement as Vice-president, he was appointed by the President of the University to be Special Advisor in Research Matters (1974–78). Later in 1974, he became Canadian Coordinator of the International Magnetospheric Study, and gave it his fullest attention until its completion at the end of 1979. During this period, he also pursued an earlier research interest in the possible influence of solar activity on prairie weather and rainfall.

Early in his career, he spent two years in the Canadian Arctic. Currie and Frank Davies worked together at Chesterfield Inlet during the Second International Polar Year (1932-1933). An online archive of Currie's work on 2nd IPY studies of the Polar Year data continued under his direction at the University of Saskatchewan after World War II.

Recognition 
In recognition of his outstanding contributions to his fields of study, he was elected a Fellow of the Royal Meteorology Society of Great Britain in 1940, and a Fellow of the Royal Society of Canada in 1947. In 1967, he received the Patterson Medal from the Canadian Meteorological and Oceanographic Society. In 1972, he was made a Companion of the Order of Canada "for his services to science and education especially in the fields of meteorology and climatology".

In 1977 he received an honorary Doctor of Science (space research) from York University.

Selected publications 

 BW Currie, (1939) Earth Currents, Journal of the Royal Astronomical Society of Canada, Vol. 33, p. 313  scanned PDF
  WD Penn and BW Currie (1949) A recording meter for auroral radiations, Canadian Journal of Research, Vol. 27A biblio. record
 WG Kendrew, BW Currie (1955) The Climate of Central Canada (book) E. Cloutier, Queen's Printer
BW Currie, (1955) Auroral Heights over Central-Western Canada, Canadian Journal of Physics 33(12): 773-779 abstract

References

External links
Obituary - Currie, Balfour-Watson 1902-1981 Obituary in The Journal of the Royal Astron. Soc. of Canada vol. 75 no. 5, p. 219, October 1981.
Biography in the Encyclopedia of Saskatchewan
"How did we get here from there?" -- account of early atmospheric research at U.Sask. by Peter Forsyth

1902 births
1981 deaths
Canadian people of American descent
Canadian climatologists
Canadian meteorologists
Canadian university and college faculty deans
Canadian university and college vice-presidents
Companions of the Order of Canada
Fellows of the Royal Society of Canada
Academic staff of the University of Saskatchewan
Presidents of the Canadian Association of Physicists